Natvarsinhji Kesarsinhji Solanki was a politician from the Gujarat state of India. He founded the Charotar Kshatriya Samaj and the Gujarat Kshatriya Sabha. He was elected to the Lok Sabha, the lower house of the Parliament of India.

Multiple political scientists, including Atul Kohli and Rajni Kothari, state that Solanki was a Rajput, but Lancy Lobo says that his Rajput origin is disputed and that he was an elite Koli. He was running Charotar Kshatriya Samaj, but later he was made co-editor of Rajput Bandhu periodical. Solanki and Narendrasinh decided to form an organization called Gujarat Kshatriya Sabha which would be for both Rajput and Koli castes.

References

External links
Official biographical sketch in Parliament of India website

Indian National Congress politicians
India MPs 1980–1984
India MPs 1984–1989
Lok Sabha members from Gujarat
1915 births
Year of death missing